This is a list of an approximate rendering of the names of the village-level divisions of the province of Anhui, People's Republic of China (PRC) into a romanized form derived from Standard Mandarin Pinyin. After province, prefecture, county-level divisions, and township-level divisions, village-level divisions constitute the formal fifth-level administrative divisions of the PRC.  This list is divided first into the prefecture-level, then the county-level divisions, then township-level divisions.

Huangshan City

Qimen County
Towns:
Qishan (祁山镇), Pingli (平里镇), Jinzipai (金字牌镇), Shanli (闪里镇), Likou, Xiaolukou (小路口镇), Anling (安凌镇), Fufeng (凫峰镇)

Townships:
Rongkou Township (溶口乡), Tafang Township (塔坊乡), Luxi Township (芦溪乡), Guxi Township (古溪乡), Xin'an Township (新安乡), Ruokeng Township (箬坑乡), Baixi Township (柏溪乡), Qihong Township (祁红乡), Datan Township (大坦乡), Zhukou Township (渚口乡)

Likou
Thirteen villages:
 Shiqi, Wuling, Guanghui, Xu, Xitang, Zhengchong, Shendu, Xiangdong, Lixi, Penglong, Huansha, Fuling, Yechen

References

Anhui
Villages